is a passenger railway station located in the city of Yawatahama, Ehime Prefecture, Japan. It is operated by JR Shikoku and has the station number "U18".

Lines
Connections with other services are needed to travel further east of Matsuyama on the line.

In addition, the Uwakai limited express also stops at the station.

Layout
The station consists of an island platform and a side platform serving three tracks. Access to the island platform is by means of a footbridge. The station building houses a waiting room, shops, a JR ticket window (Midori no Madoguchi facility) and a JR Travel Centre (Warp Plaza). Car parking and car rental is available at the station. There is a passing loop between tracks 2 and 3, in between the side and island platform and several sidings are located south of the station beyond track 3.

Adjacent stations

History
At that time, the station was operated by Japanese Government Railways (JGR), later becoming Japanese National Railways (JNR). With the privatization of JNR on 1 April 1987, control of the station passed to JR Shikoku.

Surrounding area
 Yawatahama Port Ferry Terminal
 Yawatahama Labor Standards Inspection Office
 Yawatahama Tax Office
 Yawatahama City Public Health and Welfare Cente

See also
 List of railway stations in Japan

References

External links
Station (JR Shikoku)

Railway stations in Ehime Prefecture
Railway stations in Japan opened in 1939
Yawatahama, Ehime